The 2008 Polish Pairs Speedway Junior Championship is the 2009 version of Polish Pairs Speedway Junior Championship organized by the Polish Motor Union (PZM). The Final took place on 14 August 2009 in Rybnik. The championships was won by Unia Leszno's riders: Sławomir Musielak and Przemysław Pawlicki.

Results

The Final 
 The Final
 14 August 2009 (17:30 CEST)
 Rybnik
 Referee: Tomasz Proszowski
 Best time: 64.32 - Przemysław Pawlicki in Heat 8 and Maciej Janowski in Heat 12
 Attendance: 3,000

See also 
 2009 Team Speedway Junior Polish Championship
 2009 Individual Speedway Junior Polish Championship
 2009 Polish Pairs Speedway Championship

References 

Pairs Junior